Stefan Aigner (born 20 August 1987) is a German former professional footballer who played as a midfielder.

In June 2021, Aigner announced his retirement from professional football.

References

External links
 
 

1987 births
Living people
Association football midfielders
German footballers
Footballers from Munich
Bundesliga players
2. Bundesliga players
3. Liga players
Major League Soccer players
SV Wacker Burghausen players
Arminia Bielefeld players
TSV 1860 Munich players
TSV 1860 Munich II players
Eintracht Frankfurt players
Colorado Rapids players
KFC Uerdingen 05 players
SV Wehen Wiesbaden players
German expatriate footballers
German expatriate sportspeople in the United States
Expatriate soccer players in the United States